The Valdosta Tigers were a "Class-D" minor league baseball team, based in Valdosta, Georgia, that operated in the Georgia–Florida League, from  to . The club played its home games at Pendleton Park, which was located on the current site of South Georgia Medical Center.

History 
They club through a number of affiliations and names during their existence. The team was originally an affiliate of the Pittsburgh Pirates affiliate, known as the Valdosta Trojans. In , the team became an affiliate for the Los Angeles Dodgers.

In , the Dodgers moved their operations to Thomasville, to become the Thomasville Dodgers. However, the St. Louis Browns took over the Valdosta team, which was then renamed the Valdosta Browns. A year later, the Browns left and the Detroit Tigers moved their Georgia–Florida League team to Valdosta.

The ballpark

Valdosta teams played at Pendleton Park which was located on Woodrow Wilson Drive, at a site near the city library and South Georgia Medical Center.">

Notable alumni

 Bud Clancy (1942)

 Roger Craig (1950)

 Fred Gladding (1956-1957)

 Don Hoak (1947) MLB All-Star

 Bob Johnson (1955)

 Turk Lown (1942)

 Dick McAuliffe (1958) 3 x MLB All-Star

 Stubby Overmire (1958)

 Marv Owen (1954)

 Eddie Robinson (1939-1940) 4 x MLB All-Star

 Zack Taylor (1915)

 John Tsitouris (1954-1955)  

 Don Wert (1958) MLB All-Star

Seasons

References

External links 
 

Defunct minor league baseball teams
Brooklyn Dodgers minor league affiliates
Detroit Tigers minor league affiliates
Pittsburgh Pirates minor league affiliates
St. Louis Browns minor league affiliates
1939 establishments in Georgia (U.S. state)
1958 disestablishments in Georgia (U.S. state)
Baseball teams established in 1939
Sports clubs disestablished in 1958
Defunct baseball teams in Georgia
Baseball teams disestablished in 1958